Star-crossed lovers is a term referring to a pair of lovers whose relationship is often thwarted by outside forces.

Star-crossed lovers may also refer to:

 "Star Crossed Lovers", a song by New Zealand singer Craig Scott
 Star-Crossed Lovers, a 1962 East German romantic war drama film directed by Frank Beyer
 "Star Crossed Lovers", a 1969 song by Neil Sedaka

See also
 Star-crossed (disambiguation)